The Plunderer is a 1915 American film directed by Edgar Lewis based on a 1912 mining novel by Roy Norton. The cast features William Farnum and Harry Spingler as honest miners and Claire Whitney as love interest Joan, daughter of a dishonest miner literally undermining their claim.

Cast

Production
The Plunderer was filmed on location in Dahlonega, Georgia, site of the 1829 Georgia Gold Rush.

References

External links

1915 films
American silent feature films
American black-and-white films
Fox Film films
Films directed by Edgar Lewis
1910s American films